In music, Op. 108 stands for Opus number 108. Compositions that are assigned this number include:

 Beethoven – 25 Scottish Songs
 Brahms – Violin Sonata No. 3
 Dvořák – The Noon Witch
 Fauré – Violin Sonata No. 2
 Saint-Saëns – Barcarolle in F major
 Schumann – Nachtlied for chorus and orchestra
 Shostakovich – String Quartet No. 7